Antler is a special service area in the Rural Municipality of Antler No. 61, Saskatchewan, Canada. Listed as a designated place by Statistics Canada, the community had a population of 40 in the Canada 2016 Census.

The community is approximately 120 km east of the city of Estevan and 3 km from the Manitoba border. Antler was dissolved from village status to become part of the Rural Municipality of Antler No. 61 on December 31, 2013.

Demographics

See also
 List of communities in Saskatchewan
 Special service area
 Block settlement

References

External links

Antler No. 61, Saskatchewan
Designated places in Saskatchewan
Former villages in Saskatchewan
Special service areas in Saskatchewan
Populated places disestablished in 2013
Division No. 1, Saskatchewan